The 2018 ASUN women's basketball tournament was the 32nd edition of the ASUN Conference championship. It took place March 2, 7 and 11, 2018 in several arenas at campus sites.

Format
The ASUN Championship is a three-day single-elimination tournament. Eight teams competed in the championship, with the higher seeded team in each matchup hosting the game.

Seeds

Schedule

Bracket

See also
 2018 Atlantic Sun men's basketball tournament

References

External links 
Championship Details

Tournament
ASUN women's basketball tournament